Nuevamente... Lalo (Again... Lalo) is a studio album by Lalo Rodríguez released by Global Records in 1982. The sequel to his debut album, Simplemente... Lalo contains songs written by Rodríguez himself, as well as by Tite Curet Alonso. It was re-released as Una Voz Para Escuchar in 1990.

Track listing

References

1982 albums
Lalo Rodríguez albums